Lester Thomas Kirby (born February 16, 1961) is an American politician. He is a member of the Georgia House of Representatives from the 114th District, serving since 2013. Kirby represented the 107th district from 2012 to 2013. He has sponsored 150 bills. He previously ran for the United States House of Representatives in Georgia's 7th congressional district in 2010. Kirby is a member of the Republican party.

References

External links 
 Tom Kirby at ballotpedia.org
 Tom Kirby at votesmart.org

Republican Party members of the Georgia House of Representatives
21st-century American politicians
Living people
1961 births